JTB may refer to:

 Jets to Brazil, an American rock band
 John the Baptist (died circa 30), Jewish preacher and ascetic
 JTB (gene), a human gene
 Journal of Theoretical Biology, a scientific journal
 JTB Corporation, formerly Japan Travel Bureau, the largest travel agency in Japan
 Justified true belief, a philosophical definition of knowledge
 JTB (software), a preprocessor that produces JavaCC files
 Joint IED Defeat (JIEDD) Test Board, an organization within the Joint Improvised Explosive Device Defeat Organization
 J. Turner Butler Boulevard, a major expressway in Jacksonville, Florida carrying the designation Florida State Road 202